Worlds Apart is a 1921 American silent mystery film directed by Alan Crosland and starring Eugene O'Brien, Olive Tell and William H. Tooker.

Cast
 Eugene O'Brien as Hugh Ledyard 
 Olive Tell as Elinor Ashe 
 William H. Tooker as Peter Lester 
 Florence Billings as Marcia Marshall 
 Arthur Housman as Harley Marshall 
 Louise Prussing as Phyllis Leigh 
 Warren Cook as Ten Eyck

References

Bibliography
 Monaco, James. The Encyclopedia of Film. Perigee Books, 1991.

External links
 

1921 films
1921 drama films
Silent American drama films
Films directed by Alan Crosland
American silent feature films
American black-and-white films
Selznick Pictures films
1920s American films